The NFL Films Game of the Week, formerly known as the NFL Game of the Week, is a television program that aired from 1965 to 2007. The show presented one or two NFL games from the previous week compressed into a one-hour program.

Format
Game of the Week presents the game from a wide variety of angles, including game footage, pregame and postgame commentary, and sideline sound from players and coaches.

Broadcast history
The program premiered in syndication in 1965 in a 30-minute format. With the advent of the NFL Network in 2003, it was expanded to 60 minutes and retracted from syndication for airing on the NFL's home network. 

Upon its debut on the NFL Network in 2003, it aired on Wednesday and sometimes Thursday nights. In 2006, the show moved to Friday night. The time slot has remained the same--9 p.m. and midnight Eastern and Pacific times, for a total of three showings throughout the evening. NFL Network identifies the show as "Classic Games" in its listings.

On September 10, 2007, ION Television bought rights to the show.  They announced the first episode would air September 15, highlighting the Dallas Cowboys 45-35 win over the New York Giants. ION aired the game Saturday evenings at 6:00 PM Eastern Time and ended the series on December 29. ION's rights for the show were not renewed for the 2008 NFL season.

Hosts
Steve Sabol was the host up until his death in 2012. He had been with NFL Films since its inception in 1962, and is one of only a handful of people to have viewed the first 40 Super Bowls in person.

References

External links
Game of the Week on ION Television
Game of the Week archives from 2007 season, Week 5 to Super Bowl, at NFL.com

Game of the Week
1965 American television series debuts
1970s American television series
1980s American television series
1990s American television series
2000s American television series
2010s American television series
2020s American television series
First-run syndicated television programs in the United States
Game of the Week
Ion Television original programming
English-language television shows